The 2011 by-election in Inverclyde took place on 30 June 2011. It was triggered by the death of the incumbent Labour MP, David Cairns on 9 May 2011 of acute pancreatitis.

Cairns had won the Inverclyde constituency in 2010 with a majority of 38.4%, making it a safe Labour seat. The by-election was won by Iain McKenzie MP, the Labour candidate.

Background
The by-election was caused by the death of the incumbent, David Cairns.  Cairns, a Labour Party MP, was first elected to the seat at the 2001 general election. He was suffering from acute pancreatitis and had been receiving hospital treatment since March, dying on 9 May at the Royal Free Hospital. Previously working as the Parliamentary Under-Secretary of State for the Scotland Office, Cairns became Minister of State for Scotland in 2007 but resigned in 2008 in opposition to then-Prime Minister Gordon Brown.

Cairns was re-elected at the 2010 general election with 56.0% of the popular vote in his constituency. The Scottish National Party (SNP) came second, and would require a swing of 19.25% to take the seat, and the Liberal Democrats and Conservatives held third and fourth place respectively with 12-14% of the vote share between them.

Candidates
Nominations closed on 16 June 2011, with five candidates. The Labour Party selected Ian McKenzie a local Councillor since 2003, who has led Inverclyde Council since February 2011 and the only candidate not to have run for any other constituency in the Scottish Election 2011. The Scottish National Party selected Anne McLaughlin, who was an MSP for the Glasgow regional list from 2009–2011.  The Conservative Party selected David Wilson, a local councillor and deputy provost of Inverclyde.  UKIP candidate Mitch Sorbie contested West Dunbartonshire in the 2010 general election. The Liberal Democrats selected Sophie Bridger, the president of Liberal Youth Scotland.

Result

See also
List of United Kingdom by-elections
Opinion polling for the 2015 United Kingdom general election

References

Inverclyde by-election
Inverclyde by-election
2010s elections in Scotland
Inverclyde by-election
By-elections to the Parliament of the United Kingdom in Scottish constituencies
Politics of Inverclyde